Paramesotriton yunwuensis is a species of salamander in the family Salamandridae. It is endemic to the Yunwu Mountains in Guangdong, southern China. Its type locality is near Nanchong village, Fuhe, Luoding City. Common name Yunwu warty newt has been coined for it.

References

yunwuensis
Amphibians of China
Endemic fauna of China
Amphibians described in 2010